The Iglesia María Auxiliadora is a Roman Catholic parish church in the neighbourhood of Parque Rodó, Montevideo, Uruguay. The parish was established on 22 October 1919.

The church is dedicated to Mary Help of Christians, a Marian devotion deeply held and propagated by Saint John Bosco (Don Bosco). 

The temple is part of a larger complex, including "Talleres Don Bosco", a private technical school which occupies a whole block, operated by the Salesians of Don Bosco since its establishment in 1893.

The parish is one of seven in Uruguay dedicated to Mary Help of Christians, including María Auxiliadora in Montevideo's Lezica neighbourhood, as well as churches in other municipalities around the country (Casupá, Castillos, General Enrique Martínez, Guichón and Vichadero).

References

1919 establishments in Uruguay 
 
Roman Catholic church buildings in Montevideo
Salesian churches in Uruguay
Parque Rodó, Montevideo
20th-century Roman Catholic church buildings in Uruguay